A bad habit is a negative behaviour pattern.

Bad Habits may also refer to:

Film and television
 Bad Habits (2007 film), a Mexican film
 Bad Habits (2009 film), an Australian horror film
 "Bad Habits" (The Bill), a television episode
 "Bad Habits" (Pushing Daisies), a television episode

Music

Artists

Albums
 Bad Habits (Billy Field album) or the title song, 1981
 Bad Habits (Colin James album) or the title song, 1995
 Bad Habits (Every Avenue album), 2011
 Bad Habits (The Monks album) or the title song, 1979
 Bad Habits (Nav album), 2019

Songs
 "Bad Habits" (Billy Field song), 1981
 "Bad Habits" (Ed Sheeran song), 2021
 "Bad Habits" (Jenny Burton song), 1985
 "Bad Habits" (Maxwell song), 2009
 "Bad Habits" (The Last Shadow Puppets song), 2016
 "Bad Habits" (Usher song), 2020
 "Bad Habits", by Between the Buried and Me from Colors II, 2021
 "Bad Habits", by Brass Knuckles, 2012
 "Bad Habits", by Cravity from Season 3. Hideout: Be Our Voice, 2020
 "Bad Habits", by Danny Jones, 2019
 "Bad Habits", by Delaney Jane, 2018
 "Bad Habits", by Dune Rats from Hurry Up and Wait, 2020
 "Bad Habits", by General Fiasco from Unfaithfully Yours, 2012
 "Bad Habits", by Kottonmouth Kings from Fire It Up, 2004
 "Bad Habits", by Noga Erez, 2018
 "Bad Habits", by Shaun, 2019
 "Bad Habits", by Silverstein from A Beautiful Place to Drown, 2020
 "Bad Habits", by Thin Lizzy from Thunder and Lightning, 1983

Other media
 Bad Habits (play), a 1974 play by Terrence McNally
 Bad Habits, a 2008 BBC Radio 4 show featuring Richard Herring
 Bad Habits, a 2006 collection of the comic strip The Duplex by Glenn McCoy
 "Bad Habits", a short story by Joyce Carol Oates in her 2007 collection The Museum of Dr. Moses

See also
 
 Bad Habit (disambiguation)
 Habit (disambiguation)